Cow Island is a  island in Casco Bay, Maine, off Great Diamond Island, about  northeast of downtown Portland, and is part of the Town of Long Island in Cumberland County. A non-profit youth development organization called Rippleffect owns the island and has the responsibility to protect the island's natural ecosystem as well as the island's public access.

Fort Lyons
The remains of a 1907 military installment called Fort Lyons are located on the Rippleffect side.  Rippleffect has converted these ruins into its core on-island facility, an eco-friendly campus where it runs human development programs  There are several other military installations scattered around the island, including, near the center of the island, a large pill-box under which are two tunnels that appear to have been used to store ammunition and supplies.

See also
 List of islands of Maine

References 

Islands of Portland, Maine
Casco Bay